Lake Morton is a lake in Lakeland, Polk County, Florida, in the United States.

Lake Morton bears the name of John P. Morton, who owned land near the lake.

References

Morton
Morton